What's Your Name? is the third studio album by Adam Sandler, released in 1997. Unlike his other comedy albums, which typically mix songs with non-musical comedy skits, What's Your Name? consists mostly of songs and only includes one skit. The songs are recorded in various genres, including country, hard rock, 2 Springsteen-influenced numbers, ballad and reggae, as well as the inclusion of "Red Hooded Sweatshirt", which Sandler originally performed on Saturday Night Live in 1993. What's Your Name? was certified gold, having sold over 500,000 copies.

"The Lonesome Kicker", a Bruce Springsteen-inspired song about the life of a lonely football kicker, was released as the lone single from the album and was accompanied by a music video that got airplay on MTV. This song also partly inspired Sandler's 1998 sports comedy film The Waterboy.

Critical reception

The album received mixed reviews from critics. Allmusic senior editor and critic Stephen Thomas Erlewine wrote: "Sandler may display a few new tricks, but it's not enough to win new fans, even if What's Your Name will satisfy his legions of followers." James P. Wisdom of Pitchfork stated: "What's My Name is typical Sandler as we love him, but none of these tracks compare to his last two records."

Track listing

Personnel
Adam Sandler - vocals, guitar, producer
Brooks Arthur - vocals, producer
Frank Coraci - vocals
Rob Corsi - vocals
Michael Dilbeck - vocals
Jack Giarraputo - vocals, photography
Sanetta Gipson - vocals, backing vocals
Michael Ly - vocals
Jillian Sandler - vocals
Kim Schwartz - vocals, backing vocals
Raydi Siegel - vocals
The Wailing Souls - backing vocals
Mike Thompson - guitar, keyboards
Waddy Wachtel - guitar, backing vocals
Mindi Abair - saxophone, backing vocals
Greg Leisz - pedal steel
John "Juke" Logan - harmonica
David McKelvy - harmonica
Teddy Castellucci - multiple instruments
Bob Glaub - multiple instruments
Don Heffington - multiple instruments
Jon Rosenberg - multiple instruments, producer, photography
Allen Covert - producer
Johnathan Loughran - associate producer
Jolie  Levine - production coordination
Francis Buckley - engineer
Gabe Veltri - engineer, mixing
Rudy Haeusermann - assistant engineer
Michael Parnin - assistant engineer
Jeff Robinette - assistant engineer
Stephen Marcussen - mastering
Ron Boustead - digital editing
Scott Free - stylist
Vonda Morris - make-up
David Harlan - design
Ann Pala - design
Linda Cobb - art direction
Nick DeCesare - artwork
Lester Cohen - photography
Kimberly Wright - photography

Charts

Weekly charts

Certifications

References

Adam Sandler albums
1997 albums
Warner Records albums
Comedy rock albums
Albums produced by Brooks Arthur
1990s comedy albums